Kim Yong-hyun (born 13 May 1978) is a badminton player from South Korea.

Kim competed for Korea in badminton at the 2004 Summer Olympics in men's doubles with partner Yim Bang-eun.  They had a bye in the first round and defeated Lars Paaske and Jonas Rasmussen of Denmark in the second. In the quarterfinals, Kim and Yim lost to Eng Hian and Flandy Limpele of Indonesia 15-1, 15-10.

Kim also competed in mixed doubles with partner Lee Hyo-jung. They had a bye in the first run and were defeated by Jens Eriksen and Mette Schjoldager of Denmark in the round of 16.

Achievements

Asian Championships 
Mixed doubles

World Junior Championships 
Boys' doubles

IBF Grand Prix 
The World Badminton Grand Prix sanctioned by International Badminton Federation since 1983.

Men's doubles

Mixed doubles

IBF International 
Men's doubles

Mixed doubles

References

External links 
 
 

1978 births
Living people
Sportspeople from Incheon
South Korean male badminton players
Badminton players at the 2004 Summer Olympics
Olympic badminton players of South Korea